Sri Lelawangsa is a commuter rail service in Indonesia operated by Kereta Api Indonesia (KAI), serving Medan Station to Kuala Bingai Station route (both in North Sumatra) and vice versa. The service began operation on 6 March 2010 using Kereta Rel Diesel Indonesia (KRDI) DMU by INKA.

Sri Lelawangsa was initially serving three routes from Medan to Binjai, Belawan and Tebing Tinggi respectively, before the routes was cut down into Medan–Binjai starting on 2019. In 2022, the route was extended to Kuala Bingai.

Passengers can purchase tickets at a single fare, from Medan to Binjai and vice versa Rp 5,000. , Medan to Kuala Bingai and vice versa Rp 7,000. ,Binjai to Kuala Bingai and vice versa Rp 2,000. There are 10 trips per day with the Medan - Kuala Bingai connection, there are only 2 round trips per day, while the remaining 8 are Medan - Binjai round trip.

Incident    
On December 4, 2021, the Sri Lelawangsa train crashed into a Share taxi (angkot) with license plate number BK 1610 UE at the Sekip crossing, West Medan. This incident resulted in 5 deaths and 4 injuries.

Gallery

See also 

 Kereta Api Indonesia
 Rail transport in Indonesia
 List of named passenger trains of Indonesia

References

Passenger rail transport in Indonesia
Regional rail in Indonesia
Transport in North Sumatra
Transport in Medan